KCWB (92.1 FM) is a radio station broadcasting a classic country music format. It is licensed to Byron, Wyoming. The station is currently owned by the Big Horn Radio Network, a division of Legend Communications of Wyoming, LLC.

All Big Horn Radio Network stations have their offices and studios located at 1949 Mountain View Drive in Cody. KCWB, KCGL and KTAG all share a transmitter site on Cedar Mountain off Highway 14, west of Cody.

The station signed on in June 2014.

References

External links

Classic country radio stations in the United States
Radio stations established in 2014
CWB
2014 establishments in Wyoming
Big Horn County, Wyoming